A by-election was held for the British House of Commons parliamentary constituency of Pontefract and Castleford on 26 October 1978 following the death of Labour Member of Parliament (MP) Joseph Harper on 24 June. It was one of two UK parliamentary by-elections held on that day.

The result was a Labour hold. The party's majority was reduced from the 54.2% at the October 1974 general election to a still comfortable 38.6%. Both Labour and Liberal Party candidates saw their votes fall, the latter's share of the vote being nearly halved.

The winner, Geoffrey Lofthouse, served as the constituency's MP until his retirement at the 1997 general election.

Votes

References

See also
Pontefract and Castleford (UK Parliament constituency)
List of United Kingdom by-elections (1950-1979)
1978 Berwick and East Lothian by-election

1978 elections in the United Kingdom
1978 in England
Pontefract
Elections in Wakefield
By-elections to the Parliament of the United Kingdom in West Yorkshire constituencies
1970s in West Yorkshire
October 1978 events in Europe